Benson Stanley (born 11 September 1984 in New South Wales, Australia) is a rugby union player for US Montauban in the Pro D2. Stanley is a product of Auckland Grammar. He plays as a centre. Benson is one of the Stanley rugby clan that includes Chase, Joe, Jeremy, and Kyle. Benson is also the brother of Harlequin F.C. player Winston Stanley. Stanley was named in the 2010 All Blacks squad, making three appearances during the 2010 season. He played for the Blues in the Super Rugby competition between 2008 and 2012.

In 2012, it was announced that Stanley had signed a two-year deal with French side ASM Clermont Auvergne, starting with the 2012–13 Top 14 season.

References

External links 

Blues profile

1984 births
Living people
Blues (Super Rugby) players
New Zealand rugby union players
Auckland rugby union players
Rugby union centres
University of Auckland alumni
People educated at Auckland Grammar School
New Zealand international rugby union players
Ponsonby RFC players
New Zealand expatriate rugby union players
Expatriate rugby union players in France
New Zealand expatriate sportspeople in France
ASM Clermont Auvergne players
Section Paloise players
Benson
Rugby union players from New South Wales